This is a list of Brazil over-the-air television networks, in which it has a listing of over-the-air television networks that operate their stations in Brazil. According to the Brazilian Agency of Telecommunications (Anatel), a television network is “a set of generating stations and their television relay systems with national coverage and convey the same basic programming”, following the decree number 5,371 of Presidency of the Republic.

List of networks

See also
 List of television stations in Brazil

References 

 
over-the-air